A.E. Neapoli Football Club is a Greek football club, based in Neapoli, Lasithi, Greece.

Honours

Domestic Titles and honours

 Lasithi FCA champion: 3
 1992–93, 2017–18, 2019-20

References

Football clubs in Lasithi
Association football clubs established in 1968
1968 establishments in Greece
Gamma Ethniki clubs